Mount Alexander is a mountain located approximately 125 km north-west of Melbourne, near the town of Harcourt. It rises 350 metres above the surrounding area to a level of 744 metres above sea level. Being a prominent local landmark, the mountain has its name associated with the surrounding district once known as the Mount Alexander goldfields, and presently defined as the Shire of Mount Alexander, centred on Castlemaine. Most of the mountain is included within the boundaries of the Mount Alexander Regional Park managed by Parks Victoria. The Djadjawurrung name for the mountain is Lanjanuc.

Transmission facilities
The mountain has a number of transmission sites including:
Broadcast Tower
Southern Cross site
Mt Alexander
Telstra site
Optus Site Summit 
Victoria Police site

History
The mountain, known as Lanjanuc to the Jaara Jaara people, was the location of a sacred ceremonial ground and used as an outlook.

The first European to climb the peak was Major Thomas Mitchell on 28 September 1836 during his journey of exploration through Australia Felix.  He named it Mount Byng, after John Byng, 1st Earl of Strafford, a Field Marshal during the Peninsular War, but soon changed it to honour Alexander the Great, emperor of ancient Macedonia. The overlander and explorer, Edward John Eyre, camped the north-west slope of Mount Alexander on 8 February 1838

Despite having lent its name to the most famous gold-rush of the years 1851 and 1852, the mountain itself is not gold-bearing country. The underlying rock is granodiorite.

A large outcrop of granite boulders on the western slopes of Mount Alexander is known as Dog Rocks. The manager of Sutton Grange Station, Lockhart Morton, named these rocks in 1846 because they were the favourite lair of packs of dingoes. This is now a popular abseiling site. Shepherds Flat Lookout also attained its name in the pastoral, pre-gold rush era.

The Mount Alexander goldfield was possibly the world's richest  surface alluvial goldfield. About  of gold was found within five metres of the surface in the first two years of the rush, from late 1851 to 1853. In the early 1850s, Alexander Tolmer established a gold escort route between Mount Alexander and Adelaide to serve South Australian gold miners. The service also carried mail between diggers and their Adelaide families.

Large-scale quarrying of granite on the mountain started in 1859, with stone supplied for the building of the for the Melbourne to Echuca Railway. Cornish quarryman Joseph Blight had arrived in the colony in 1855 and achieved some success in quartz reef mining at Eureka Reef. He then turned to quarrying at Mount Alexander, at first providing stone for the railway. He began to work the Blight's Quarry site in 1862  Harcourt Granite has earned a reputation as a first-rate building/dimensional stone. It is used for building and monumental work, with waste stone being cut for spalls.

A huge bonfire constructed on the summit was lit to honour the visit of the then Duke of Edinburgh in 1867

Large areas on Mount Alexander were reserved for use by the Victorian Ladies Sericulture Company. Under the leadership of Mrs Bladen Neill, and her manager Mrs Jessie Grover twenty acres were fenced, cleared and planted with mulberry trees. A stone cottage was built and the rearing of silkworms commenced. A quantity of silk was produced but the unsuitability of the situation forced the abandonment of the enterprise in 1876 

A granite cairn marking the summit was built in 1876 and serves as a trigonometric station. 
Upon the relief of Mafeking the young men of the district erected and lit a bonfire on the summit, this was visible for a very great distance.   Also in 1900 the Lands Department cleared 20 acres at the foot of Mount Alexander at what was known as Picnic Gully and planted  a variety of oaks, predominantly valonia oaks, to supply tanning material to local tanneries.  In 1910 the first plantation of pinus insignus (Pinus radiata) was established south of the Oak Forest and the strong demand by Harcourt Fruit Growers led to the subsequent expansion of the plantation to provide wood for packing cases.  These plantations were  harvested for the final time following the leasing of the plantation areas to Hancock Victorian Plantations. The area occupied by the pine trees is being revegetated with native species.

Target Rock is a notable feature of the north-west slopes, marking the site of a rifle range utilised by the militia between the Boer War & World War I.

Langs Lookout commemorates the efforts of James H. Lang, to have a tourist road constructed across the top of the range. In 1928, Lt-Col. Lang, in his Buick piloted by Alan Lang, and Cr J. R. Duggan in his Chevrolet, accompanied by the Hon H. S. W. Lawson, proceeded across the mount in a zig-zag fashion to prove that such a road was feasible. The party stopped at this lookout before travelling on to the other end of the range.  The road that they pioneered is now known as Joseph Young Drive, in honour of the long-serving Metcalfe Shire councillor.

In an attempt to return native fauna to the mount, a Koala Park was established in 1943. The park was stocked with koalas from Phillip Island and managed by a committee of local residents. This park was later relocated and enlarged. It was abandoned in 2009. Leanganook picnic facilities are located near the entrance to the former Koala Park.

Mount Alexander hosts a unique member of the brassica genus called southern shepherd's purse (ballantinia antipoda). This tiny plant grows in small patches of moss on granite outcrops in damp locations. Ballantinia antipoda has become extinct in all other documented sites in Victoria. The plant is nationally recognised as a threatened species.

Mount Alexander has many recreational walking tracks, ranging in degree of difficulty from the easy to the challenging.

See also

List of mountains in Victoria

References

External links
Mount Alexander Regional Park Parks Victoria
Place Names Search: Mount Alexander Geoscience Australia
Walking Tracks Map of Mount Alexander Cartography Community Mapping
 

Alexander